The Backbone Fire was a wildfire that started near Payson, Arizona on June 16, 2021. The fire burned  was fully contained on July 19, 2021.

Events 

The Backbone Fire was first reported on June 16, 2021, at 11:30 pm MST. The cause of the fire is believed to be due to lightning. On July 19, 2021, the Backbone Fire reached 100% containment.

Impact

Closures and Evacuations 
Fossil Creek Recreation Area was closed on June 17, 2021 due to wildfire danger. On June 19, 2021, the USDA Forest Service Coconino National Forest issued an Emergency Area Closure of areas around the Backbone Fire on the Coconino and Tonto National Forests. The Coconino National Forest was fully closed on June 23, 2021 due to fire danger, dry conditions, persistent wildfire activity, and limited availability of firefighting resources. The Coconino National Forest was reopened on July 6, 2021.

References 

2021 Arizona wildfires
June 2021 events in the United States
Wildfires in Arizona